The 2009–10 season was the 113th season of competitive football by Heart of Midlothian, and their 27th consecutive season in the top level of Scottish football, competing in the Scottish Premier League.

Hearts  first four SPL games of the 2009–10 season were announced as Dundee United away, Rangers at home, newly promoted St Johnstone away and Kilmarnock at home. Heart of Midlothian made five signings over the summer break: Ian Black, Dawid Kucharski, Ismael Bouzid, Suso Santana and David Witteveen.

On 13 August 2009, Hearts manager Csaba Laszlo announced the appointment of midfielder Michael Stewart to the role of club captain, replacing Robbie Neilson after his move to Leicester City. Central defender Marius Zaliukas was appointed vice-captain. On 17 August 2009, Stewart was sent off against Dundee United in a 2–0 reverse at Tannadice.

Despite a poor start to the season Hearts recorded a 1–0 win over Celtic in the League Cup at Parkhead with a Michael Stewart penalty.

Laszlo was sacked on 29 January, after a 3–0 home loss to Aberdeen. Jim Jefferies was appointed shortly afterwards to the job, for a return to Tynecastle.

Before the January transfer window was closed, Jim Jefferies signed Ryan Stevenson from Ayr United for a five figure undisclosed fee. Jefferies first game in charge was against St Mirren in the League Cup. He did not enjoy a successful start as Hearts crashed out of the League Cup, losing 1 – 0 to St Mirren, with Billy Mehmet the only scorer. Jefferies' first league game in charge saw his team lose 2 – 0 to Celtic.

Shortly after the Celtic away defeat, Hearts some form under Jefferies. Three wins in a row against Falkirk, Hamilton and Aberdeen saw Hearts move to 6th place in the league. Although, the winning streak ended at Dundee Utd away, losing 1 – 0, which saw them only 7 points ahead of 7th placed Aberdeen, with Aberdeen having a game in hand.

Hearts' win over Kilmarnock on 10 April 2010 confirmed their place in the top six for the SPL late-season split.

September 

Bosnian Fundraising

On 23 October 2009, Hearts supporter Gary Gray gave over £4,500 to two Bosnian children's charities after raising the money himself. Original Article

"Remember" Shirts

On 21 October 2009, Umbro released a limited edition Hearts shirt for the weekend game against Falkirk. The shirts had a poppy sewn into the left side of the shirt and a picture of the Hearts memorial statue sewn into the right. The memorial statue commemorates when the whole Hearts team enlisted themselves into the Great War, the first team in Britain to do so.Hearts News – Commemorative Shirt

Matches

Pre-Season Friendlies

Scottish Premier League

UEFA Europa League

League Cup

Scottish Cup

League table

Captains

See also
List of Heart of Midlothian F.C. seasons

Notes

References
 Hearts FC Official Website – First Team Fixtures and Results 2009–10
 Edinburgh Evening News – Heart of Midlothian FC

Heart of Midlothian F.C. seasons
Heart of Midlothian